Hemp in Washington State has emerged as an experimental crop in the 21st century.

Historical production
The U.S. Government reported no hemp production in Washington in 1890, nor did the state government in 1914 or 1922.

Related crops in Washington
Cannabis and Humulus lupulus are both members of the family Cannabaceae, and a number of similarities in the botany and human use of the two species have been noted. Humulus lupulus produces hops, a crop grown in quantity west of the Cascades historically (especially the Snoqualmie and Puyallup River valleys) and is a major 21st century crop in the Yakima Valley.

Prohibition and legalization
All cannabis was made illegal by the Washington State Legislature in 1923.
Although Washington voters legalized marijuana in 2012 with I-502, the initiative did not authorize hemp cultivation or sales.

In accordance with the Federal 2014 Farm Bill, the state legislature created an Industrial Hemp Research Pilot (IHRP) in 2016 following passage of ESSB 6206 (codified as Revised Code of Washington Chapter 15.120), with regulation by the Washington State Department of Agriculture. Industrial hemp is defined in Washington as cannabis with a THC concentration of 0.3 percent or less by dry weight. Under the 2018 farm bill, the state's Department of Agriculture is recognized by the United States federal government as the regulator for industrial-scale non-experimental hemp production.

State law defines hemp-derived products containing less than 0.3% THC as "Cannabis Health and Beauty Aids".

Following the 2018 United States farm bill, the state legislature passed SB 5276, and it was signed by the governor on April 26, 2019, establishing a full-scale agriculture program and allowing acquisition of crop seed without federal approval. Revised Code of Washington chapter 15.140 was added as a result.

First crops

The state's first post-Prohibition experimental hemp crop was planted at Moses Lake in 2017. The first crop on tribal land in the United States may have been planted by the Confederated Tribes of the Colville Reservation in 2017.

See also
Cannabis in Washington (state)

Footnotes

References

Sources

Further reading

 (profiles Belltown Hempery, Fremont Hemp Company, and others)

External links
WSDA Industrial hemp
Industrial Hemp Association of Washington
Washington Hemp Industries Association (Hemp Industries Association chapter)

Agriculture in Washington (state)
Cannabis in Washington (state)
Washington